Inner Demon is a 2014 Australian horror film directed by Ursula Dabrowsky, starring Sarah Jeavons, Kerry Ann Reid and Andreas Sobik.

Cast
 Sarah Jeavons as Sam Durelle
 Kerry Ann Reid as Denise
 Andreas Sobik as Karl
 Scarlett Hocking
 Todd Telford as Wayne

Release
The film was released on various digital platforms on 21 April 2017.

Reception
John Skipp of Fangoria wrote that while the performances of Jeavons and Reid are "truly outstanding", Sobik "dominates every single moment he’s in (and infects every moment he’s not), with an almost Klaus Kinski level of mesmerizing, blowtorching psychosis behind his glowering, drug-addled calm and command."

Howard Gorman of Scream rated the film 3 stars out of 5 and called it a "compelling and relevant film, providing audiences with much more to mull over than your average genre flick."

Film critic Kim Newman wrote that while the film "gets into a rut (or stuck in a cupboard) in that it seems to be recycling riffs in its menaced-by-a-maniac, trapped-in-a-confined-space and ghosts-on-the-loose phases", Jeavons' performance is "good" and her character an "unusually likeable screen teen", the dynamic between characters Denise and Karl "interesting" and it has a "couple of decent shocks and reversals."

Joel Harley of Starburst rated the film 5 stars out of 10 and wrote that "In spite of its accomplished lead performance and impressively oppressive atmosphere, this one is just a bit too introverted."

References

External links
 
 

Australian horror films
2014 horror films
2014 films